Ingenieros Coliseum is an indoor sporting arena located in Tegucigalpa, Honduras. The capacity of the arena is 7,500.

External links 

Indoor arenas in Honduras
Basketball venues in Honduras